Bradley Aaron may refer to:

Bradley Aaron Keselowski, NASCAR racer
Bradley Aaron Mills, pitcher for the Seattle Mariners